Sir Sydney H. Wylie Samuelson  (7 December 1925 – 14 December 2022) was a British film director and cinematographer. He was appointed in 1991 by the government of the UK as the first British Film Commissioner.

Early life
Sydney Wylie Samuelson was born in Paddington, London, to George Berthold Samuelson, a cinema pioneer of the silent film era, and Marjorie Emma Elizabeth Vint. He was educated at the Irene Avenue Council School in  Lancing, West Sussex.

Career
Samuelson started his career as a rewind boy at the Luxor cinema in Lancing, West Sussex. After working in several cinemas in the Midlands as a relief operator for the ABC circuit, he got a job as a trainee film editor with Gaumont British, which was then at Lime Grove in London.

After serving in the Royal Air Force from 1943 to 1947, he got a job as a trainee cameraman with the Colonial Film Unit. He then went on to work for Rayant Pictures, for whom he filmed the Coronation of Elizabeth II in 1953. In 1954, he set up Samuelson Film Service, hiring out film equipment. He went on to become the first British Film Commissioner and remained in the post for six years. He was chosen as chairman of the management board of BAFTA in 1976 and was a permanent trustee.

In 1985, he received the Michael Balcon Award, and in 1993 a Fellowship of BAFTA, the Academy's highest honour. Samuelson was appointed a Commander of the British Empire (CBE) in the 1978 Birthday Honours for service to BAFTA, and knighted in the 1995 Birthday Honours for services to the film industry.

Samuelson wrote the foreword featured in the book  In Conversation with Cinematographers by David A. Ellis, published by the American publisher Rowman & Littlefield. He was the first President of the UK Jewish Film Festival. He remained in the role until 2005, and as of 2010 was the UKJFF Honorary Lifetime Patron.

Personal life and death
Samuelson died at his home on 14 December 2022, aged 97.

References

External links

1925 births
2022 deaths
Knights Bachelor
Commanders of the Order of the British Empire
BAFTA fellows
BAFTA Outstanding British Contribution to Cinema Award
Sydney
British Jews
Royal Air Force personnel of World War II
People from Paddington
Film directors from London